Chris Pizzotti (born June 29, 1986) is a former American football quarterback. He was signed by the New York Jets as an undrafted free agent in 2009. He played college football at Harvard.

Pizzotti was also a member of the Green Bay Packers.

Early years
Pizzotti attended Reading Memorial High School in Reading, Massachusetts.

College career
Pizzotti attended Harvard University where he majored in Economics. He was selected First-team All-Ivy League in 2007 and 2008.

Professional career

New York Jets
After going undrafted in the 2009 NFL Draft, Pizzotti was signed by the New York Jets as an undrafted free agent on May 1, 2009. He was waived on August 15, 2009. He was re-signed on August 21, only to be waived again on August 30.

Green Bay Packers
On December 9, 2009, Pizzotti was signed to the Green Bay Packers practice squad after the team lost former practice squad quarterback Mike Reilly after Reilly was signed to the St. Louis Rams active roster. On January 11, 2010, Pizzotti was signed to reserve/future contract.

On May 20, 2010, the Packers released Pizzotti and signed Graham Harrell.

References

External links
New York Jets bio

Further reading

1986 births
Living people
Players of American football from Massachusetts
American football quarterbacks
Harvard Crimson football players
New York Jets players
People from Reading, Massachusetts
Green Bay Packers players
Sportspeople from Middlesex County, Massachusetts